Bishop's Tachbrook is a village and civil parish in the Warwick District of Warwickshire, England. A church at Bishop's Tachbrook is mentioned in the Domesday Book. The village contains traditional half-timbered buildings, and modern residences including council-owned terraced housing.
Facilities and amenities include The Leopard public house, the oldest part of which was a morgue for the nearby crematorium, small retail outlets including a corner shop, a primary school for children aged 4 to 11, and a park which includes a BMX track. 

The 'Victory Club' is used for social purposes by the church. There is sports and social club which is the base for Leamington Hibernians Football Club of the Midland Football League, while the National League North side Leamington F.C. play near the village. Local governance is provided by a parish council. According to the 2001 Census the parish had a population of 2,514, increasing to 2,558 at the 2011 Census. The Guide Dogs for the Blind Association breeding centre is based just to the south of the village.

References

External links
 
 Bishop's Tachbrook Parish Council web site

Villages in Warwickshire